FC Braşov started the 2009–2010 season of Liga I with the goal of qualifying for the Europa League.

Manager
On April 29, 2009, Răzvan Lucescu was appointed head coach of the national football team and resigned from his position at FC Braşov at the end of the season.
The Italian Nicolò Napoli was brought to replace Răzvan Lucescu as the main coach, but left the club after only three weeks, on July 27 during the season break, accusing familial problems. Viorel Moldovan was appointed as main coach the same day. However, a month later Napoli signed a contract with another Liga I team, Astra Ploieşti.

Squad

 (captain)

Transfers

Pre-season

In:

Out:

Mid-season

In:

Out:

Liga I

League table

Results summary

Results by round

Results

Cupa României

References

Brasov